Stathmopoda aposema is a species of moth of the family Stathmopodidae. The common name is Kowhai Seed Moth. It is found in New Zealand.

References

Stathmopodidae
Moths of New Zealand
Moths described in 1901
Taxa named by Edward Meyrick